The 2017 FIA European Touring Car Cup was the thirteenth and last running of the FIA European Touring Car Cup. It consists of six events in Italy, Hungary, Germany, Portugal, Belgium and Czech Republic. The championship is again split into two categories: ETCC 1 (including TC2 Turbo, TC2, TCN-2 and Super 2000 machinery) and ETCC 2 (including Super 1600 machinery).

Teams and drivers 
The races at the Nürburgring had both WTCC and ETCC competitors. ETCC competitors entered with their usual car numbers, but with 100 added up to it.

Race calendar and results 
The first four rounds will support the World Touring Car Championship.

Championship standings
Points were awarded to the top eight classified finishers using the following structure:

Qualifying points: 1 2 3 refers to the classification of the drivers after the qualifying for first race, where bonus points are awarded 3–2–1.

† - Half points were awarded for race 2 at Vila Real.

References

External links 
 

European Touring Car Cup
European Touring Car Cup
Touring Car Cup